Alwoodley is a civil parish and suburb of Leeds in West Yorkshire, England. Alwoodley lies in Leeds 17 which was reported to contain the most expensive housing area in Yorkshire and the Humber by The Times.

The area is situated in the Alwoodley ward of Leeds City Council and Leeds North East parliamentary constituency.

Geography

The area comprises a large part of the postcode LS17, which contains most of north Leeds and the surrounding countryside. On either side of Alwoodley is Adel, to the west, and Shadwell, to the east.  Most of the housing is between Nursery Lane and Alwoodley Lane. The area to the north is mainly countryside, including the Eccup Reservoir and two golf courses. To the south are Moor Allerton and Moortown.

History

The name Alwoodley is thought to derive from Old English Æthelwald-lēah, meaning 'the woodland clearing (lēah), at Æthelwald's farm'. It appears as Aluuoldelei in the 1086 Domesday Book.

The route of the Roman road between Ilkley and Tadcaster, road 72b in Margary's numbering, passes through Alwoodley. Part of it was excavated along Lakeland Crescent in 1994.

Alwoodley became part of the County Borough of Leeds on 1 April 1928 as a consequence of the passage of the Leeds Corporation Act 1927.

Civil Parish
The civil parish boundaries are from Nursery Lane on the south, following the Meanwood Valley Trail on the west, the A61 Harrogate Road on the east. The northern boundaries are in countryside between Harewood to the northeast and Arthington to the northwest. Note that Alwoodley Gates is an area to the east of the A61 inside the Harewood civil parish.

Electoral Ward

The Electoral Ward includes the above area, but also Alwoodley Gates to the east and southwards part of Moortown as far as the Leeds Outer Ring Road. This article will include this larger area, which includes certain institutions associated with the area but just outside the civil parish boundary.

As of 2021 the councillors for this ward (all Conservatives) are Neil Buckley, Dan Cohen and Peter Harrand.

Church of England Parish

The Church of England parish of Alwoodley is based upon the church of St Barnabas, in the Diocese of Ripon and Leeds. The parish boundaries extend from King Lane in the West to the A58 Wetherby Road to the East, thus including Shadwell. They also include part of Moortown south of the Ring Road around Moortown Corner.

Housing
The former mansion, Alwoodley Old Hall, was close to the south side of Eccup Reservoir: it was demolished in 1969, and the grounds were used for Sandmoor Golf Club, north of Alwoodley Lane.

The centre is a large open area, including Moortown Golf Club and Rugby Club and former farmland known as Alwoodley Moss. Around it are 4 regions of housing, nearly all low-rise, semi-detached or detached. In the northwest corner (junction bounded by King Lane to the west and Alwoodley Lane to the North) is housing called Alwoodley Park and includes street names such as "The Avenue", "The Lane", "The Drive" etc. reflecting the former more isolated nature of the original village. In the northeast corner (junction bounded by Alwoodley Lane on the north and Harrogate Road on the east) is the Sandmoor Estate. In the southeast corner (bounded by Nursery Lane on the south and Harrogate Road on the east) is the Primley Park area. Where Sandmoor and Primley Park join is Sandmoor Court, a block of flats. The southwest corner (bounded by Nursery Lane to the south and King Lane to the west) consists of housing on streets such as the Sunningdales, the Birkdales and the Turnberrys.

The residential areas on and around the Sandmoors, Alwoodley Lane and Wigton Lane are amongst the most exclusive in Leeds, with many large detached family homes, imposing mansions and exclusive flat developments.

Education

The two largest schools in the area are Allerton High School and The Grammar School at Leeds Junior & Senior site. Alwoodley is served by two Jewish Faith Schools, both on the Henry Cohen Campus, Brodetsky Primary School, and a high school, Leeds Jewish Free School, (Which was founded in 2013 by local city councillor, Dan Cohen).

Sport
There are three golf clubs within the area, namely Alwoodley, Moortown and Sandmoor Golf Clubs.  Moortown Golf Club was also the home of the 1929 Ryder Cup.  Alwoodley Cricket Club dates back to 1935. There are two Rugby Union clubs in the area: Leodiensian RUFC and Moortown Rugby Club.

Alwoodley is also home to Alwoodley FC, a football team that compete in the top tier of the Yorkshire Amateur League.

Gallery

Location grid

See also
Listed buildings in Alwoodley

References

External links

Alwoodley Ward Councillors website
Ward Councillor Dan Cohen's website
YEP Moortown Today community website covering Alwoodley
Alwoodley Parish Council website
 

Places in Leeds
Civil parishes in West Yorkshire